Nandakumar Assembly constituency is an assembly constituency in Purba Medinipur district in the Indian state of West Bengal.

Overview
As per orders of the Delimitation Commission, No. 207  Nandakumar Assembly constituency is composed of the following: Nandakumar community development block and Bishnubarh I, Padumpur I and Padumpur II gram panchayats of Tamluk community development block.

Nandakumar Assembly constituency is part of No. 30 Tamluk (Lok Sabha constituency).

Election results

2016
In the 2016 West Bengal Legislative Assembly election Sukumar De of Trinamool Congress defeated his nearest rival Siraj Khan, who was an Independent candidate supported by the LF - INC Alliance.

2011

  

.# Swing calculated on Congress+Trinamool Congress vote percentages taken together and vote percentage of WBSP, in the now-defunct Narghat constituency in 2006.

References

Assembly constituencies of West Bengal
Politics of Purba Medinipur district